IGP Charentais, formerly known as vin de pays charentais up until 2009, is a French wine region and protected geographical indication (indication géographique protégée). It covers the French départements of Charente and Charente-Maritime in south-west France.

Grape varieties
Red, rosé and dry white wines are produced in the IGP Charentais.

Red varieties: Cabernet Franc, Cabernet Sauvignon, Gamay, Merlot and Pinot Noir.  These varieties are also used to produce rosé wine.

White varieties: Chardonnay, Colombard, Sauvignon blanc.

Soils
The most common soil type is clay-limestone, but more sandy soils are present in the coastal areas and on the île de Ré and île d'Oléron.

Climate
The IGP Charentais has a moderate maritime climate.  The average temperature is 13 °C.

Taste profile
The Official Bulletin of the French Ministry of Agriculture outlines typical organoleptic profiles of IGP Charentais wines.

Red wines generally show a red fruit, ripe fruit and spice character.  They are light in body but have nice structure and smooth tannins.

White wines are characterized by their refreshing acidity and citrus aromas.

Yields
The maximum yield is 90 hectoliters/hectare.

Supplementary geographic designations
Wines with grapes harvested in the following sub-regions can be labelled with following supplementary designations:
 Île de Ré
 Ile d'Oléron
 Saint-Sornin

References

French wine
Wine regions